The 2010–11 Taça de Portugal, also known as Taça de Portugal Millennium for sponsorship reasons, was the 71st season of the Taça de Portugal. A total of 172 clubs from all four tiers of Portuguese football took part in this tournament. In the final (played at the Estádio Nacional, in Oeiras), Porto beat Vitória de Guimarães by 6–2, in a reedition of the 1988 final.

Participating teams
The following teams took part in this competition:
Liga Zon Sagres (16 teams, 2 in competition)

Liga Orangina (16 teams)

Second Division (46 teams)

Terceira Divisão (94 teams)

First round
In this round entered teams from the Segunda Divisão (3rd level) and the Terceira Divisão (4th level). Twenty teams received a bye to the Second Round: 1º de Maio (III), Alcochetense (III), Aliados Lordelo (II), Amarante (III),  Atlético da Malveira (III), Camacha (II), Coimbrões (II), Esposende (III), Limianos (III), Maria da Fonte (III), Mondinense (III), Monsanto (III), Moura (III), Paredes (III), Penalva do Castelo (III), Pontassolense (II), Praiense (II), Sousense (III), Tirsense (II) and Tondela (II). The matches were played on September 4 and 5, 2010.

Second round
In this round entered teams from Liga Orangina (2nd level) and the winners from the first round. The matches were played on September 18 and 19, 2010.

Third round
In this round entered teams from Liga ZON Sagres (1st level) and the winners from the second round. The matches were played on October 10, 16 and 17th and December 23, 2010.

1 0-3 defeat was given to both teams.

Fourth round
The matches were played on November 21, December 12, 2010 and January 5, 2011.

2 It was scheduled that the winner of the match between Bombarralense and Louletano would play against U. Madeira, but both teams have been eliminated, and so U. Madeira is qualified to next round.

Fifth round
The matches were played on December 11, 12, 2010 and January 12, 2011.

Quarter-finals
The matches were played on 12, 26, 27 and 28 January 2011.

Semi-finals

Final phase bracket
Teams that are listed first played at home in the first leg.

|}

First leg

Second leg

3–3 on aggregate. Porto won on away goals.

Vitória de Guimarães won 1–0 on aggregate.

Final

Top scorers

Last updated: 27 January 2013

Footnotes
 Boavista was suspended for two years for forfeiting a match in the 2009-10 season.
 Marítimo B team is not allowed to take part in the competition, as rules forbid the participation of "B teams".

References

External links
Official webpage 

2010-11
2010–11 domestic association football cups
Cup